Jeong Gyeong-hun (born 27 April 1961) is a South Korean modern pentathlete. He competed at the 1984 Summer Olympics.

References

1961 births
Living people
South Korean male modern pentathletes
Olympic modern pentathletes of South Korea
Modern pentathletes at the 1984 Summer Olympics